Melbourne is a small community located within Middlesex County, Ontario, Canada.  It lies on the boundary between two municipalities, Strathroy-Caradoc and Southwest Middlesex.  About half the population of Melbourne lives in each municipality.

The community was probably named for Melbourne, Victoria, Australia.

References

Communities in Middlesex County, Ontario